Wollochet is located in Pierce County and is a census-designated place community with a  2010 census population of 6,651.

Census-designated places in Pierce County, Washington
Census-designated places in Washington (state)